This is a list of films produced in Albania during the 1990s.

Films
  (1990)
  (1990)
  (1990)
  (1990)
  (1990)
  (1990)
  (1990)
  (1990)
  (1991)
  (1992)
  (1992)
  (1992)
  (1993)
  (1993)
  (1993)
  (1994)
  (1994)
  (1994)
  (1994)
  (1994)
  (1996)
  (1996)
  (1997)
  (1997)
  (1998)
 Funeral Business (1999) short

References

Lists of Albanian films